Non-possession (aparigraha) is a philosophy that holds that no one or anything possesses anything. ln Jainism, aparigraha is the virtue of non-possessiveness, non-grasping or non-greediness.

Aparigrah is the opposite of parigrah, and refers to keeping the desire for possessions to what is necessary or important, depending on one's life stage and context. The precept of aparigraha is a self-restraint (temperance) from the type of greed and avarice where one's own material gain or happiness comes by hurting, killing or destroying other human beings, life forms or nature.

Aparigraha is related to and in part a motivator of dāna (proper charity), both from giver's and receiver's perspective.

Non-possession is one of the principles of Satyagraha, a philosophical system based on various religious and philosophical traditions originating in India and Asia Minor, and put into practice by Mahatma Gandhi as part of his nonviolent resistance. This particular iteration of aparigraha is distinct because it is a component of Gandhi's active non-violent resistance to social problems permeating India. As such, its conception is tempered with western law. Non-possession is, by definition, concerned with defining the concept of possession. Non-possession does not deny the existence of the concept of possession. Gandhi intertwined non-possession and voluntary poverty in application, but living according to the guidelines of non-possession is not the same as living in poverty. In practice, the principle of taking what one needs (rather than less than or more than), is essential to the viability of non-possession/ aparigraha, therefore, an essential component. Like possession, humans (and other animals, and entities) deviate from this because of social conditioning. This practice is only a principle when one is not aware of or does not acknowledge all events which have either direct or indirect impact on oneself. Awareness and acknowledgment occurs without specific effort when an entity develops
 a broadened awareness of all events which have a direct or indirect impact on the individual entity;
 the ability to process this information, (see relationships, derive meaning);
 the ability to translate the conclusion of the above into actions.

The action of taking enough to continue working but not more than one needs, is a generalized description of one of those actions. Understanding that no one or anything possesses anything is a specific condition which occurs when one can derive meaning and see the relationships between more events from different perspectives.

Etymology and meaning
Aparigraha is a compound in Sanskrit, made of "a-" and "parigraha". The prefix "a-" means "non-", so "aparigraha" is the opposite of "parigraha", so aparigraha is speech and actions that oppose and negate parigraha.

Parigraha means ‘to amass’, ‘to crave’, ‘to seek’, ‘to seize’, and ‘to receive or accept’ material possessions or gifts from others. The word also includes the idea of doing good with the expectation of benefit or reward, not just for the sake of merely doing good. Parigraha includes the results as well as the intent; in other words, it means the attitudes of craving, possessiveness, and hoarding, but also the things that have been acquired because of those attitudes. The concept of aparigraha as one of the means to liberate the soul from the cycle of birth and death was first laid down by first tirthankara in Jainism, Rishabhdeva.

Monier-Williams states that the word "parigraha" has roots in the Vedic texts as well, referring to fencing an altar, enclosing something, assuming or putting on a dress or receiving something. In the Brahmanas and later texts, the term contextually means accepting or taking a gift, acquiring, possessing, claiming, controlling something such a property, or assistance, or constraining force on others. In some texts, the root reflects the state of marriage or having a family.

The virtue of aparigraha means taking what is truly necessary and no more. In Yoga school of Hinduism, this concept of virtue has also been translated as "abstaining from accepting gifts", "not expecting, asking, or accepting inappropriate gifts from any person", and "not applying for gifts which are not to be accepted". The concept includes in its scope non-covetousness, and non-possessiveness. Taylor states, aparigraha includes the psychological state of "letting go and the releasing of control, transgressions, fears" and living a content life unfettered by anxieties.

Jainism

Aparigraha is one of the virtues in Jainism. It is also one of the five vows that both householders (Śrāvaka) and ascetics must observe. This Jain vow is the principle of limiting one's possessions (parimita-parigraha) and limiting one's desires (iccha-parimana).

In Jainism, worldly wealth accumulation is considered as a potential source of rising greed, jealousy, selfishness and desires. Giving up emotional attachments, sensual pleasures and material possession is a means of liberation, in Jain philosophy. Eating enough to survive is considered more noble than eating for indulgence. Similarly, all consumption is more appropriate if it is essential to one's survival, and inappropriate if it is a form of hoarding, show off or for ego. Non-possession and non-attachment are a form of virtue, and these are recommended particularly in later stages of one's life. After ahiṃsā, Aparigraha is the second most important virtue in Jainism.

Jainism views attachments to material or emotional possessions as what leads to passions, which in turn leads to violence. In addition, Jain texts mention that "attachment to possessions" (parigraha) is of two kinds: attachment to internal possessions (ābhyantara parigraha), and attachment to external possessions (bāhya parigraha). For internal possessions, Jainism identifies four key passions of the mind (kashaya): anger, pride (ego), deceitfulness, and greed. In addition to the four passions of the mind, the remaining ten internal passions are: wrong belief, the three sex-passions (male sex-passion, female sex-passion, neuter sex-passion), and the six defects (laughter, like, dislike, sorrow, fear, disgust).

In Jainism, non-possession is one of the five vows (mahavratas) that both ascetics and householders (śrāvaka) have to observe. Jain texts mentions that "attachment to possessions (parigraha) is of two kinds: attachment to internal possessions (ābhyantara parigraha), and attachment to external possessions (bāhya parigraha).
The fourteen internal possessions are:
Wrong belief
The three sex-passions
Male sex-passion
Female sex-passion
Neuter sex-passion
Six defects
Laughter
Liking
Disliking
Sorrow
Fear
Disgust
Four passions
Anger
Pride
Deceitfulness
Greed

External possessions are divided into two subclasses, the non-living and the living. According to Jain texts, both internal and external possessions are proved to be hiṃsā (injury).

Hinduism

In the Yoga Sūtras (II.30), aparigraha is listed as the fifth of the Yamas or code of self-restraint, after with  Ahimsa (nonviolence), Satya (non-falsehoods, truthfulness), Asteya (not stealing), and Brahmacharya (sexual chastity in one's feelings and actions).

Aparigraha is thus one of the five essential restraints (yamas, "the don'ts") in Hinduism, that with five essential practices (niyamas, "the dos") are suggested for right, virtuous, enlightened living. While Yoga Sutras distills the ten yamas and niyamas, these virtues appear, in various discussions, in Vedic texts. It is part of ethical theory in Hinduism.

James Wood states, aparigraha is the virtue of abstaining from appropriating objects because one understands the disadvantages in "acquiring them, keeping them, losing them, being attached to them, or in harming them". Patanjali suggests that greed and coveting material wealth increases greed and possessiveness, a cycle that distracts from good reasons for activity that should motivate a person, and ultimately to a state where a person seeks 
When we start to satisfy desires, new levels of greed or attachment can start to develop. Coupled with asteya, parigraha (coveting/hoarding) can lead an individual to lie, steal, cheat, or even murder for the desired item, regardless of the outcome of their actions. Greed is probably the highest act of not practicing aparigraha, since greed generally equates to collecting things well beyond one's immediate or foreseeable future needs.

A significant change is bringing about an orderly virtue, diligence into fields formerly motivated by unhealthy competition and monetary gain, the latter made human life to be unconcerned and uninterested about the positions moved to other states and more so, switched to temporary replacements, and is informally to restrict available services due to moment by moment choices, also by hoarding funds and wealth. Coveting and harmful accruement violates a belief in property ownership as a result of ones own efforts.

Restraint from possessiveness and greed, or aparigraha, leads one away from harmful and injurious greed, refraining from harming others, and towards the spiritual state of good activity and understanding one's motives and origins. The virtue of non-coveting, non-possessing is a means of Sādhanā, path of spiritual existence. In outer world, aparigraha manifests as non-possessiveness with simple living; while in psychological terms, it is a state of non-attachment, non-craving and one that envelops the sense of contentment.

Jealousy is an eventual result of a mental setup directed by accumulation and then want of accomplishments garnered by successful people, numerous accomplishments will accumulate jealousy without any real limit that could control and inhibit this desire. Shadripu are spiritual ailments preventing our movement to from the material to a higher awareness and good direction (dama) of the senses. Impulses can be broken down by a surrender of the outcome or by surrender of the ego to God.

Possession in Satyagraha
Possession denotes the de facto claim on another entity based on exclusive access. If access is non-exclusive of some entity, then the object in question is not being possessed.

The concepts of possession and ownership often overlap, but are not the same. Ownership takes into account the entitlement to priority of access, which are necessarily based on agreements and other mutually consenting social protocols.

If more than one entity has access to something simultaneously, and one or more of the entities assert priority of access (exclusivity) over the other(s), or if some external force endows or demands priority of one entity, a group of entity, over some other(s), then there is conflict. Even if those who are excluded concur to such claims, their de facto access will present conflict by necessity.

In the event that more than one entity has access to something simultaneously, exclusion occurs when:
(a) one or more of the entities assert priority of access over the other(s),
(b) some external force endows or demands priority of 1 entity, a group of entities, over some other(s).

Even if those who are excluded concur to the claimed priority, the de facto simultaneous access necessarily present conflict between claim to priority and what actually happens.

Note that the conflict begins with assumed priority not matching empirical reality. Also note that claim can only occur with communicative acts or verbal communication. Concurrence also requires communication, but one cannot concur unless a claim has been posed first (passive action).

The concept of ownership could have been invented, in part, to resolve this dilemma, by instating a system of social protocols.

Ownership as resolution

Ownership increases the frequency of consensus over disagreement. Using social protocols, ownership establishes one or a group of entities' permanent priority of access to something. Unless the owner relinquishes this right, this established priority stands regardless of empirical phenomena.

A dilemma arises when an entity enters into the sphere of a consensus with no prior knowledge of the agreement. Empirical phenomena would be the basis for both conceptual and empirical reality.

An example of this is Britain entering India. With the simultaneous desire to procure resources already claimed by the aggregate Indian society, and lack of desire to participate in Indian society, Britain's subjects actively challenged established ownership. The act also defined all inhabitants, including not only those actively participating in Hindu society, but also those participating passively (Untouchables,) as part of an aggregate entity. Before asserting its own ownership upon said resources, British interests challenged existing Indian society's ownership by de facto possession (by virtue of being present in India,) India's lack of utilization for said resources (contrasting with Britain's moral and lawful utilization of them, as concurred by its peer nations,) and the inability for India to counter-challenge Britain legally and philosophically.

Non-possession is another concept which can resolve this dilemma. If claims always match empirical reality, then there is no conflict. Eliminating exclusion, claims to priority of access will always be based on empirical reality.

Non-possession as resolution 
If claims always match empirical reality, then there is no conflict.

Boundaries are a given. Possession as the defining mechanism for boundaries is also a given.

If entities have no cause to endow or assert priority of access over the other(s), cause to exclude is removed. The goal of claiming access will then not be to exclude.
The goal of the claims will still remain:
(a) one or more of the entities assert priority of access over the other(s),
(b) some external force endows or demands priority of one entity, a group of entities, over some other(s).
The motivation to establish priority of access will always be based on empirical reality.
By extension, pre-established hierarchies of access (ownership) will not increase the frequency of consensus unless the hierarchies support empirical reality. Empirical reality always takes precedence over conceptual reality.

Non-possession is another concept which resolves the dilemma which arises when reasoned reality conflicts with empirical reality.

Non-possession provides for conditions under which none of the entities have cause to assert exclusivity which is not concurred by others.

Contrast with some entity which has ownership of something; if some other entity has possession of that thing, the owner has the right to concede or deny the legitimacy of that other entity's possession. Possession is a necessary component of ownership, but ownership is not a necessary component of possession.
This does not mean that something cannot be possessed by some entity other than its owner. It means that the owner of a thing has the exclusive right to concede or deny the legitimacy of anyone who possesses this thing, even if the owner has no intention of accessing the object of possession. Further, the owner has the ability to concede or deny his/her/its own legitimacy of possessing the object of possession. In application, ownership is often asserted when it is challenged by possession (de facto claim to access exclusive of the owner.)

Non-possession denies the exclusive access of an entity by another entity.

To paraphrase: non-possession says that no entity has the right to exclusive access to another entity, either by social agreement, or de facto exclusive access.

Challenge posed toward possession 
By definition, non-possession is the opposite of possession. There is inherent conflict between the two approaches to organizing priority of access. It is notable that practitioners of non-possession acknowledge the existence of possession. See .

Those practicing possession do not necessarily acknowledge non-possession for several reasons. Here, they are defined by conditions occurring within different layers of an individual entity's experience:
 not aware of non-possession as an amalgamated concept, (contrast with the awareness of the complex concept of possession);
 non-possession presents logical conflict in the cognitive process when one comes into contact with issues of boundaries and priority of access, therefore, the concept (alternative) is consistently disposed of during the cognitive process;
 non-possession presents interpersonal conflict when one is engaged in social activities.

Non-stealing
The practical implications of non-possession can be clarified by defining another principle of Satyagraha: non-stealing.

Non-stealing is the practice of not breaching an entity's entitlement of or sense of entitlement toward something.

Theft has to do with breaching ownership: both possession and sense of entitlement. Non-possession only challenges the idea of possession, not entitlement.

There are concepts associated with ownership which do not conflict with non-possession, such as willingness to cultivate that which is owned, recognition of benefit conferred upon the owner, positive opinion and/ or feelings toward that which is owned, negative opinion and/ or feelings etc.

Under non-possession, these reactions are not (and cannot be) reserved toward possessions. As such, traditional definitions of theft and the reasons for not stealing require clarification.

Sense of entitlement
Sense of entitlement has to do with emotional attachment beyond practical benefit and usefulness to an entity's perceivable physical survival. The belief that one deserves to receive an opportunity or reward. The myriad of ways a sense of entitlement can arise include legal claim, length of time spent with the object, birthright, labour exerted, labour not exerted, comparative social standing, inheritance, perspective, lack of perspective, etc. Practitioners of religious traditions such as Buddhism, Jainism, even the three major western religious traditions consciously aspire to extricate from or modify non-practical emotional attachment in some form. There are branches of philosophy which deal exclusively with such modifications such as Stoicism.

Non-stealing takes the approach of applied Hinduism in that it recognizes that not everyone would either choose to extricate from or would be successful extricating from attachment at any given time. As well, possession exists de facto, and is often cited as support of entitlement to an object of possession.

Theft
In the absence of possession (and ownership by extension,) theft would be impossible. But theft is possible under the non-possession worldview. This is possible given that not everyone in the world practices non-possession. It is also difficult to put non-possession into practice under existing socio-economic systems. People have the right to, and likely have to define their boundaries out of necessity.
All historically recorded cultures either prescribe laws regarding individuals' personal boundaries, or imply the limits of the individual through practices. Absence of conventions and protocol undermine the ability for humans to understand each other at the conscious level, without which, civilization is not possible. Boundaries between individual entities is an essential component of any grouping, including civilization; they exist in empirical reality and by definition.

Across cultures, the definition of these boundaries can be explicit, implicit, or entirely personal. The United States Constitution has provisions for rights to personal property, but no explicit provisions for boundaries.

Boundaries are one of the essential given conditions for possession to be possible. The reverse is not true. Possession deals with the relationship of something to boundaries, a relationship in which boundaries provide the principle to qualify whether something is being possessed or not being possessed. A boundary can be defined to be independent of the idea of possession: the threshold between two identifiable, separate entities.

Logically, the existence of theft would be invalid If there are no rules as to how one can and cannot define boundaries. Without the ability to define a boundary, there is no way to discern where one entity begins and the other ends, therefore, not possible to define possession. Without possession, there can be no ownership, claim to ownership, or theft.

Hypothetical example:
If some entity has the ability to lay claim to any object without contest, theft is still possible. One can steal from this entity if one is not part of this entity. Also, that the entity is empowered to lay claim necessitates that there are objects which the entity can lay claim upon, therefore, objects which this entity does not possess. Boundaries may exist between objects before the entity lays claim to them, (that is, if it intends to lay claim to them.)  Breach of these boundaries constitute theft. A hypothetical entity empowered to lay claim upon any object can also approach a grey area between legitimate possession and theft if its possession of an object is not clearly defined, that is, if this entity itself has doubts as to whether it possesses the object in question.

Boundaries exist in empirical reality because people and things obviously do not melt together upon touching. While some systems of thought would contest this even on a limited level, and there are counterexamples, especially when dealing with ideas, in general, it is accepted that boundaries exist at least in some areas of consensus reality. Non-possession does not directly address boundaries, therefore, it neither negates nor confirms the concept. The very existence of boundaries almost necessitates possession, (add graphic) but things can exist on boundaries. Also, boundaries are sometimes defined by possession.

Taking into account both the logical provisions and also that non-possession is a social philosophy specifically applicable to sentient beings (e.g. people), the act of breaching another entity's sense of entitlement constitutes theft.

The specific possessive act of attachment is involuntary, it cannot stop unless the peripheral stimulus which causes it is also removed. The peripheral stimulus can be something which supports the very fabric of consensus reality, like boundaries. As such, non-possession, as a social philosophy, does not and cannot challenge the peripheral stimulus. To paraphrase: attachment begets entitlement in a non-logical, non-physical sense. Given the above, the boundary that is requisite for entitlement to exist on the non-logical, non-physical level is outside of non-possession's scope. This is not the case for aparigraha.

Non-stealing is a necessary component in addition to non-possession because of Satyagraha's applicative nature. Non-possession does not negate boundaries.

Gandhi's view was that possession is more trouble than it is worth.

The possession of anything then became a troublesome thing and a burden. Exploring the cause of that joy, I found that if I kept anything as my own, I had to defend it against the whole world. . . . And I said to myself: if [other people] want it and would take it, they do so not from any malicious motive but . . . because theirs was a greater need than mine.

Relation to charity and conservation
Some suggest aparigraha implies the concepts of charity (dāna) and conservation. Taking and wasting more of nature, or from others, is inconsistent with the ethical precept of aparigraha.

Scholars suggest aparigraha allies with ideas that inspire environmental and ecological sustainability. Aparigraha suggests the reduction of waste and adds a spiritual dimension to preventing destructive consumption of ecosystems and nature.

Difference from Asteya 
Asteya is also one of the five vows taken by Jain ascetic monks to attain liberation. It is the virtue of non-stealing and not wanting to appropriate, or take by force or deceit or exploitation, by deeds or words or thoughts, what is owned by and belongs to someone else. Aparigraha, in contrast, is the virtue of non-possessiveness and non-clinging to one's own property, non-accepting any gifts or particularly improper gifts offered by others, and of non-avarice, non-craving in the motivation of one's deeds, words and thoughts.

In literature
The ancient Tamil moral text of Tirukkural speaks about aparigraha in its chapters on renunciation (Chapter 35) and extirpation of desire (Chapter 37), besides various other places.

See also 
Civil disobedience
Cooperative
Gift economy
Moderation
Non-profit
Non-violence
Nonviolent resistance
Property
Socialism

References

Sources

 
 
 

Schools of economic thought
Gandhism
Jain ethics
Hindu philosophical concepts
Simple living
Yoga concepts
Relational ethics
Hindu ethics